Rhododendron prinophyllum, the early azalea, is a rhododendron species native to the eastern and southern United States. It is a deciduous shrub that grows 4 to 8 feet in height. Flowers are pink.

References 

 "Rhododendron prinophyllum", Rhododendrons 229 229 1917.
 The Plant List
 USDA PLANTS Profile
 Missouri Botanical Garden
 Hirsutum.com
 ARS: Rhododendron prinophyllum

prinophyllum
Flora of the Eastern United States
Plants described in 1914